Ahmednagar, is a city situated in the Ahmednagar district, Maharashtra, India, about 120 km northeast of Pune and 114 km from Aurangabad. It is the seat of its namesake district.

Ahmednagar takes its name from Ahmad Nizam Shah I, who founded the town in 1494 on the site of a battlefield where he won a battle against superior Bahamani forces. It was close to the site of the village of Bhingar. With the breakup of the Bahmani Sultanate, Ahmad established a new sultanate in Ahmednagar, also known as Nizam Shahi dynasty.

Ahmednagar has several dozen buildings and sites from the Nizam Shahi period. Ahmednagar Fort, once considered almost impregnable, was used by the British to house Jawaharlal Nehru (the first prime minister of India) and other Indian Nationalists before Indian independence. A few rooms there have been converted to a museum. During his confinement by the British at Ahmednagar Fort in 1944, Nehru wrote book The Discovery of India. Ahmednagar is home to the Indian Armoured Corps Centre & School (ACC&S), the Mechanised Infantry Regimental Centre (MIRC), the Vehicle Research and Development Establishment (VRDE) and the Controllerate of Quality Assurance Vehicles (CQAV). Training and recruitment for the Indian Army Armoured Corps takes place at the ACC&S.

Ahmednagar is a relatively small town and shows less development than the nearby western Maharashtra cities of Mumbai and Pune. Ahmednagar is home to 19 sugar factories and is also the birthplace of the cooperative movement. Due to scarce rainfall, Ahmednagar often suffers from drought. Marathi is the primary language for daily-life communication. Ahmednagar has recently published a plan of developing the city by year 2031.

History
The town Ahmednagar was founded in 1490 by Ahmad Nizam Shah I on the site of a more ancient city, Bhingar. With the breakup of the Bahmani Sultanate, Ahmad established a new sultanate in Ahmednagar, also known as Nizam Shahi dynasty.

It was one of the Deccan sultanates, which lasted until its conquest by Mughal emperor Shah Jahan in 1636. Aurangzeb, the last Mughal emperor, who spent the latter years of his reign, 1681–1707, in the Deccan, died in Ahmednagar and is buried at Khuldabad, near Aurangabad in 1707, with a small monument marking the site.

In 1759, the Peshwa of the Marathas obtained possession of the place from Nizam of Hyderabad and in 1795 it was ceded by the Peshwa to the Maratha chief Daulat Rao Sindhia. Ahmednagar was besieged by a British force under Richard Wellesley and captured. It was afterward restored to the Marathas, but again came into the possession of the British in 1817, according to the terms of the Treaty of Poona, and was known as Ahmednuggur. 

In 19th century American christian missionaries open first morden schools in the this town. According to a report there was 4 girl's school was running under the supritendance of Cynthia Farrar, around 1850s  Jyotiba Phule visited them and got inspired to open school for girls in Poona. Later he enrolled his wife Savitribai Phule in Farrar's school in a teacher's training program. Farrar was from America and spent his entire life in Ahmednagar running her schools, these schools girls one of the first such kind in the country.

Military base
Ahmednagar is home to the Indian Armoured Corps Centre & School (ACC&S), the Mechanised Infantry Regimental Centre (MIRC), the Vehicle Research and Development Establishment (VRDE) and the Controllerate of Quality Assurance Vehicles (CQAV). Training and recruitment for the Indian Army Armoured Corps take place at the ACC&S. Formerly, the city was the Indian base of the British Army's Royal Tank Corps / Indian Armoured Corps, amongst other units.  The town-houses the second-largest display of military tanks in the world and largest in Asia.

Geography

Climate 
Situated in the rain shadow region of the Western Ghats, Ahmednagar has a hot semi-arid climate (Köppen BSh). The climate is hot throughout the year and sweltering during the pre-monsoon months from March to mid-June, whilst monsoon rainfall averages less than a third of that received in Mumbai and about a tenth what is received in Mahabaleshwar on the crest of the mountains.

Demographics

As of 2011 Indian census, Ahmednagar had a population of 347,549. Males constitute 53% of the population and females 47%. Ahmednagar has an average literacy rate of 84%, higher than the national urban average of 79.9%. 10% of the population is under 6 years of age.

Notable people

 Malik Ambar, Siddi military leader who led a successful guerrilla war to defend Ahmednagar against the Mughal Empire and the founder of Aurangbad City founded in 1604
 Sadashiv Amrapurkar, noted film and theatre actor
 Rajanikant Arole, doctor, Magsaysay Winner, Padmabhushan
 Meher Baba, spiritual leader 
 John Barnabas, evolutionary biologist
 Chand Bibi, Nizamshahi princess, defended Ahmednagar Fort against the Mughal forces of Emperor Akbar
 Madhu Dandavate, Indian Politician 
 Michael J. S. Dewar, theoretical chemist
 Cynthia Farrar, American missionary
 Anna Hazare, Gandhian and social activist
 Adhik Kadam, social activist, social entrepreneur and philanthropist. 
 Pramod Kamble, painter and sculptor
 Zaheer Khan, cricketer
 Anna Leonowens, educator, feminist, author of The English Governess at the Siamese Court (1870)
 Spike Milligan, 1918–2002, comedian and author
 Shahu Modak, film actor
 Bahirji Naik, Head of Intelligence Agency of Shivaji's army
Popatrao Baguji Pawar, Padmashri, Sarpanch Hiware Bazar
 Ajinkya Rahane, cricketer
 Anand Rishiji, Jain saint
 Sai Baba of Shirdi, spiritual master
 Narayan Waman Tilak, Christian writer, poet, pastor

Tourist places

 Tomb of Salabat Khan II – also called the Chand Bibi Palace, this is a solid three-storey stone structure situated on the crest of a hill 13 km from Ahmednagar city.
 Meherabad, where the samadhi (tomb) of the spiritual master Meher Baba is a place of pilgrimage, particularly on the anniversary of his death, Amartithi. His later residence was at Meherazad (near Pimpalgaon village), approximately nine miles north of Ahmednagar.
 Ahmednagar Fort (Bhuekot Killa) – Built by Ahmed Nizam Shah in 1490, this is one of the best-designed and most impregnable forts in India. , it is under the control of the military command of India. 
 Cavalry Tank Museum – The Armoured Corps Centre and School has created a museum with an extensive collection of 20th-century armoured fighting vehicles.
 
Ralegan Siddhi – a village which is a model for environmental conservation. Social activist Anna Hazare is from Ralegan Siddhi.
Pimpri Gawali – is a village in Parner taluka, about 25 km away from Ahmednagar and known for the watershed development and agribusiness activities. 
 Avhane, Shevgaon – Temple of Ganesh (Nidrista/Sleeping).
Shri Munjaba Tample, Ukkadgaon – In Shrigonda Taluka about 60 km from Ahmednagar main city it is very beautiful Temple with four big statue of ganapati, mahadev (shankar), vishnu and hanuman on Temple and thousands of devotees visit this place.
 Jamgaon – Place in Parner taluka with a historic 18th-century palace built by Mahadaji Shinde.
 Shree Kshetra Korthan Khandoba Devastan Temple of Lord Khandoba.
 Mahatma Phule Krishi Vidyapeeth, Rahuri Mahatma Phule Krishi Vidyapeeth is an agricultural university at Rahuri, named after an activist and social reformer of 19th century—one of four agricultural universities in the state.
Mula Dam: It is 52 km from the Ahmednagar City
Shani Shingnapur - Temple of God Shani

Transport

Air
Ahmednagar has 1 airport, the nearest domestic airport at Shirdi at 90km. While the nearest International Airport is at Pune.

Ahmednagar city has air connectivity by Seaplane service. The port for Seaplane is located at the Mula Dam water reservoir, 30 min away from Ahmednagar City. The service offered by Maritime Energy Heli Air Services Pvt. Ltd. (MEHAIR) from 22 September 2014. Ongoing Flight is available from Juhu, Mumbai to Mula Dam.

Rail

Ahmednagar railway station (station code:ANG) belongs to Solapur Division of Central Railway zone of the Indian Railways. Ahmednagar has rail connectivity with Pune, Manmad, Kopargaon, Shirdi, Daund, Goa, Nasik and other metro-cities like New Delhi, Mumbai, Chennai, Kolkata, Bangalore, Ahmedabad. 41 express trains stop at this station. There is still a demand for direct rail connectivity to other major cities of India.
Ahmednagar station will now be a part of the Pune railway division. 24 stations of the Daund-Ankai section will be merged with Pune railway division. The Daund-Ankai section is currently under the management of the Solapur railway division. The change to the Pune division will increase the chances of starting demu services between Ahmednagar and Pune stations.

One of the oldest and important railway project of Ahmednagar railway station was kalyan-Ahmednagar railway project which was in planning stage since British regime. It was referred as 3rd ghat project. The survey of this project was carried out in 1973,2000, 2006, 2014 etc. This project was in pink book in 2010. unfortunately this project could not be completed. The alignment length of this project was 184 km and it could have been shortest route for marathwada, andhra and Telangana. The major challenge for this project was proposed 18.96 km tunnel in malshej ghat section.

Malshej Kriti samiti is following for kalyan ahmednagar railway project. Kalyan-murbad section which is first phase of this project is already under survey stage.

Survey of Ahmednagar-Aurangabad Railway line with 120 km length was also carried out in March 2021. The DPR Report of this project is under preparation.

Ahmednagar-Karmala railway option is also getting explored.  Ahmednagar railway station will become an important railway junction in future to the level similar to daund railway junction. Kalyan-Murbad-Ahmednagar line is also possible in future.

Road
Ahmednagar is well connected by roads with major cities of Maharashtra and other states. Ahmednagar has 4 lane road connectivity to Aurangabad, Parbhani, Nanded, Pune, Nashik, Beed, Solapur, Osmanabad. National Highway 222 from Kalyan to Nirmal near Adilabad in Telangana passes through the city. The Maharashtra State Road Transport Corporation (MSRTC) and different private transport operators provide bus service connecting the city to all parts of the state.

Ahmednagar has 3 main bus stands: 
 MSRTC Tarakpur Bus Stand – All the buses going via Ahmednagar, do stop here.
 Maliwada Bus Stand – The buses going to Aurangabad/ Jalgaon/ Akola take a halt here.
 Pune Bus Stand – Buses going to Pune/Mumbai take a halt here.

Intra city transport
Several ways to have a commute in the city. Autorickshaws, which can be trusted as a private commute in the city. Sharing rikshaws also been part of the daily life of the citizen. Newly bus service has been established by Municipal corporation in the month of July 2019 which can turn a safer and cheaper commute to the citizens in the future. Main routes in the city are:
 Maliwada Bus stand to Nirmalnagar via Delhi gate, Patrakar chowk, Premdan chowk, Professor colony, and Pipeline road.
 Maliwada Bus stand to Dr.Vikhe Patil College, Vilad ghat. via Delhi gate, Patrakar chowk, Premdan chowk, Savedi naka, Nagapur MIDC, and New Nagapur.
 Maliwada Bus stand to Kedgaon via Sakkar chowk, Kinetic Chowk, Railway flyover and Ambikanagar.
 Maliwada Bus stand to Bhingar via Market Yard chowk, Nagar college, GPO Chowk, Ahmednagar fort, Shukrawar Bazaar, and Bhingar wes.
 Maliwada Bus stand to Nimbalak via Delhigate, Patrakar chowk, Premdan chowk, Savedi naka and Nagapur MIDC

Politics
Ahmednagar Municipal Council was upgraded to Municipal Corporation status in 2003. As of 2022, Rohini Shendage of Shiv Sena is the incumbent mayor. Ahmednagar city is represented in the central and state legislatures by the Ahmednagar Lok Sabha and Ahmednagar City Vidhan Sabha seats respectively. The Sitting MP is Dr.Sujay Vikhe Patil and while seating MLA is Sangram Jagtap.

Media and communication
 Newspapers: Lokmat, Sakaal, Sarvamat, Deshdoot, Punyanagri, Samana, Loksatta, Nava Maratha, Nagar Times, Divya Marathi, Maharashtra Times, Samachar, Savedi Mitra
 TV Channel: CMN Channel, News Today 24 Ahmednagar, ATV Ahmednagar
 Radio: 104 MY FM, AIR Nagar FM, Radio City, Dhamaal 24, Radio Nagar FM
 Internet: Internet facilities are provided by several suppliers

References

External links

 Ahmednagar: Places to Visit
Ahmednagar sultane
Talukas of Ahmednagar district
Ahmednagar (Lok Sabha constituency)

 Ahmednagar Bus Stands Center Contact list

 
1494 establishments in Asia
15th-century establishments in India
Populated places established in the 1490s
Former capital cities in India
Cities and towns in Ahmednagar district
Cities in Maharashtra